Genius by Stephen Hawking is a television series aired on PBS hosted by Stephen Hawking. It premiered on May 18, 2016, and ended on June 1, 2016, with only one season being produced before Hawking's death in 2018.

Premise
Genius by Stephen Hawking is a series that first aired on PBS on Wednesdays, from May 18 to June 1, 2016. Professor Stephen Hawking challenges volunteers to think like geniuses and solve some of humanity's most enduring questions. What, Why, Where, are We (as in humanity) are covered, as well as Are We Alone and Can We Time Travel. Generally three volunteers with these questions are followed as they try to find the answers to their questions. The idea is to teach the volunteers and watchers how to think like a genius. All are G-rated TV hour episodes originally aired in pairs.

Episodes

References

External links
Genius by Stephen Hawking PBS https://www.pbs.org/genius-by-stephen-hawking/home/
http://www.metacritic.com/tv/genius-by-stephen-hawking

PBS original programming
Stephen Hawking
2016 American television series debuts
2016 American television series endings
2010s American television miniseries
English-language television shows
Documentary television series about science
Science education television series
2010s American documentary television series